Julius may refer to:

People
 Julius (nomen), the name of a Roman family (includes a list of Ancient Romans with the name)
 Julius (name), a masculine given name and surname (includes a list of people with the name)

 Julius (judge royal) (fl. before 1135), noble in the Kingdom of Hungary
 Julius, Count of Lippe-Biesterfeld (1812–1884), German noble
 Julius, Duke of Brunswick-Lüneburg (1528–1589), German noble

Arts and entertainment
 Julius (Everybody Hates Chris), a character from the American sitcom
 "Julius" (song), by Phish, 1994

Other uses
 Julius (chimpanzee), a chimpanzee at Kristiansand Zoo and Amusement Park in Norway
 Julius (month), the month of the ancient Roman calendar originally called Quintilis and renamed for Julius Caesar
 Julius (restaurant), a tavern in Greenwich Village, New York City
 Julius (software), an open-source speech recognition decoder

See also
 Julius Baer Group, a Swiss bank
 Julius Caesar (disambiguation)
 Juliusz, a given name
 Orange Julius, an American chain of fruit drink beverage stores, and eponymous beverage